Jollibee is a Filipino  chain of fast food restaurants owned by Jollibee Foods Corporation (JFC). As of December 2021, JFC had a total of about 1,500 Jollibee outlets worldwide, with restaurants in Southeast Asia, the Middle East, East Asia (Hong Kong, Macau), North America, and Europe (Spain, Italy, UK).

History
In 1975, Tony Tan Caktiong and his family opened a Magnolia ice cream parlor in Cubao, Quezon City. The outlet later began offering hot meals and sandwiches upon request from customers. When the food items became more popular than ice cream, the family decided to convert the ice cream parlor into a fast food restaurant, which became the first Jollibee outlet in 1978. Management consultant Manuel C. Lumba advised the family on the change in strategy. Jollibee was initially named "Jolibe", but changed its name to "Jollibee".

The company that would be managing the fast food chain, Jollibee Foods Corporation, was incorporated in January 1978. By the end of that year, there were seven branches in Metro Manila. The first franchised outlet of Jollibee opened in Santa Cruz, Manila in 1979.

Jollibee experienced rapid growth. It was able to withstand the entry of McDonald's in the Philippines in 1981 by focusing on the specific tastes of the Filipino market, which differed from the American fast food company. The first provincial Jollibee outlet opened in Barangay Dau of Mabalacat, Pampanga. The first Jollibee store overseas, in Taiwan, opened in 1986 but is now closed. Jollibee continued to expand and set up outlets both within the country and abroad. In 1995, Jollibee introduced the Burger Steak to its menu. In 2021 Jollibee announced that they plan to open 509 stores in the US and Canada.

Products

Jollibee is a fast food restaurant with American-influenced items, as well as casual Filipino fare.

Among the establishment's best sellers are the Yumburger, the house hamburger first introduced during their early days of operation; the Chickenjoy, a fried chicken meal introduced in the 1980s which comes in both regular and spicy versions; and Jolly Spaghetti, a Filipino sweet-style interpretation of spaghetti, which is being advertised as "the meatiest, cheesiest spaghetti". (The Jolly Spaghetti resembles that of Italian spaghetti, with its blanket of ragù, but under the ground beef are pieces of hot dog and ham.)

Outside the Philippines, key products such as its chicken, spaghetti, and burgers are sold overseas but also offers localized products in its international markets such as chili chicken in Vietnam and nasi lemak in Brunei. In the Philippines, Jollibee serves Coca-Cola products for its beverages; in overseas markets, the chain serves Pepsi products.

Signature products

Chickenjoy
The Chickenjoy, a key product of Jollibee is a breaded crispy fried chicken meal. The meal can be ordered in a number of different options from their menu. Examples include in by itself, with rice and gravy, with fries,  with buttered corn, or with spaghetti.

Yumburger

The Yumburger (also spelled as Yum Burger, or Yum!) is a hamburger  sold by Jollibee and one of the fast food chain's signature products. The Yumburger was among the initial food items sold by Jollibee and was their first flagship product.

In 2017, a new edition called the Aloha Yumburger was introduced. The hamburger contains a beef patty topped with mayonnaise. The burger can be bought at different prices, depending on the size.

In 1998, the burger was introduced in the United States, which also garnered the attention of other countries such as Singapore, Italy, and Qatar. In 2017, the company re-launched the Aloha Yumburger, and in 2018 the Yumburger was introduced in Manhattan and London, with advertising focused on the double Yumburger. The burger was also introduced in Edmonton, Canada.

In 2017, an advertising video on YouTube about the Yumburger went viral in the Philippines. A 2019 Yumburger commercial about love on Father's Day later spawned some memes.

Merchandise depicting the Yumburger was released in 2018 as a collectible toy set with the Jolly Kiddie Meal.

In The Daily Telegraph, Michael Deacon described the Yumburger as "a slim, floppy, somewhat damp hamburger slathered with a strangely sweet mayo" in his three-star review of a Jollibee location in London.

Ownership and management
Jollibee is owned by the Jollibee Foods Corporation which is based in Pasig, Philippines. JFC has been open to franchising since 1979 with over 1000 Jollibee outlets being operated by franchisees. JFC also owns other fast food brands in the Philippines such as Chowking, Greenwich Pizza, Red Ribbon Bakeshop, Mang Inasal, and Burger King Philippines.

Branch locations

Jollibee started with five branches in 1978. The JFC has Jollibee branches outside the Philippines in locations in other countries in Southeast Asia, Hong Kong, the Middle East, North America, and Italy.

As of May 2019, Jollibee operates over 1,300 stores, 1,150 of which are in the Philippines, its country of origin, and 234 are situated in foreign markets.

In North America, Jollibee has presence in Canada and the United States. The first Jollibee outlet in North America opened in the United States in Daly City, California on June 13, 1998. In 2016, Jollibee opened a restaurant on Ellice Avenue in Winnipeg, Manitoba, marking the company's first location in Canada.

Jollibee first entered Europe in 2018 with the opening of a branch in Milan, Italy. London, United Kingdom became the second location in Europe when it opened on October 20, 2018.

They also had branches in Taiwan, and China. The first branch in Taiwan, opened in 1986, was the first branch overseas. Jollibee launched its first branch in Dubai in 1995 but it was later closed. It returned to the Dubai market in mid-2015 and currently operates 16 franchises across the United Arab Emirates. Due to the 1997 Asian financial crisis, the chain was forced to withdraw its operation in Malaysia and Indonesia. After a 21-year absence, Jollibee returned its operation in Malaysia after the commencement of its Kota Kinabalu outlet in December 2018. In 2013, they opened their first branch in Singapore, and have since opened five branches.

With at least a branch in Guam, it also had a larger presence in Oceania. It had branches in the US territory of the Northern Mariana Islands and in Papua New Guinea.

In August 2022, Jollibee opened in Times Square.

Marketing and advertising

Customer base
Outside the Philippines, Jollibee's primary customers are different per country or region. In the Middle East, Jollibee's primary market are the Overseas Filipino Workers while in Vietnam it is the local population. Vietnam has more than a hundred outlets in 2019, or majority of its outlets outside the Philippines.

Mascots

Jollibee is a large anthropomorphic bee mascot dressed in a red blazer, shirt, and chef's hat, and was introduced in 1980. During the mascot's conception, Mickey Mouse of Disney was made as the benchmark for Jollibee's design. The mascot was designed to epitomize Filipino optimism. Tony Tan, chairman and founder has compared the mascot's character to the Filipino working folk reasoning that the bee "hops around and produces sweet things for life, and is happy even though it is busy".
Other mascots were also made for the Jollibee fast-food chain, some of them featured in Jollitown, a children's show aired in the Philippines.

Mass media

Television series

On April 13, 2008, a children's television program called Jollitown was launched. The timing was chosen to highlight Jollibee's 30th anniversary. Jollibee and his friends: Yum the scientist, Twirlie the star performer, Hetty the cheerleader and Popo the gym coach were the stars of the show, which aired Sundays, 9:30 a.m. or 8:00 on GMA Network. On July 17, 2011, Jollitown moved to ABS-CBN for its fourth and fifth season, airing Sundays at 9 am. On July 20, 2013, the show moved back to GMA Network for The Jollitown Kids Show or Jollitown Season 6 until it ended on October 12, having run for almost five years.

Web advertising
In November 2018, the 23 original Kwentong Jollibee videos on its YouTube channel reached a total of 64 million views. After nearly two years the total views had risen to 405 million, with 567 thousand subscribers, in July 2020.

Notes

See also
 Filipino cuisine
 Filipinos in the New York City metropolitan region
 Filipino pastries

References

Further reading
 Videos

External links
Jollibee
Jollibee USA

 
 
Fast-food hamburger restaurants
Fast-food chains of the Philippines
Fast-food chains of the United States
Fast-food chains of Canada
Regional restaurant chains in the United States
Regional restaurant chains in Canada
Restaurants established in 1978
1978 establishments in the Philippines
Philippine brands
Fictional bees
Restaurants in Manitoba